The 1984 Texas Longhorns baseball team represented the University of Texas at Austin in the 1984 NCAA Division I baseball season. The Longhorns played their home games at Disch–Falk Field. The team was coached by Cliff Gustafson in his 17th season at Texas.

The Longhorns reached the College World Series final, but were eliminated by Cal State Fullerton.

Personnel

Roster

Coaches

Schedule

! style="background:#BF5700;color:white;"| Regular season
|- valign="top" 

|- align="center" bgcolor="ccffcc"
| February 17 ||  || Disch–Falk Field • Austin, TX || W 9–1 || 1–0 || 
|- align="center" bgcolor="ccffcc"
| February 17 || Texas Lutheran || Disch–Falk Field • Austin, TX || W 12–10 || 2–0 || 
|- align="center" bgcolor="ccffcc"
| February 18 ||  || Disch–Falk Field • Austin, TX || W 7–0 || 3–0 || 
|- align="center" bgcolor="ccffcc"
| February 18 || Texas–Arlington || Disch–Falk Field • Austin, TX || W 14–0 || 4–0 || 
|- align="center" bgcolor="ccffcc"
| February 19 || Texas–Arlington || Disch–Falk Field • Austin, TX || W 3–2 || 5–0 || 
|- align="center" bgcolor="ccffcc"
| February 19 || Texas–Arlington || Disch–Falk Field • Austin, TX || W 12–7 || 6–0 || 
|- align="center" bgcolor="ccffcc"
| February 23 || at Arizona State || Packard Stadium • Tempe, AZ || W 6–4 || 7–0 || 
|- align="center" bgcolor="ffbbb"
| February 24 || at Arizona State || Packard Stadium • Tempe, AZ || L 0–4 || 7–1 || 
|- align="center" bgcolor="ffbbb"
| February 25 || at Arizona State || Packard Stadium • Tempe, AZ || L 5–6 || 7–2 || 
|- align="center" bgcolor="ccffcc"
| February 28 ||  || Disch–Falk Field • Austin, TX || W 6–3 || 8–2 || 
|- align="center" bgcolor="ccffcc"
| February 28 || St. Mary's (TX) || Disch–Falk Field • Austin, TX || W 16–4 || 9–2 || 
|-

|- align="center" bgcolor="ffbbb"
| March 2 || Cal State Fullerton || Disch–Falk Field • Austin, TX || L 2–10 || 9–3 || 
|- align="center" bgcolor="ccffcc"
| March 2 || Cal State Fullerton || Disch–Falk Field • Austin, TX || W 4–2 || 10–3 || 
|- align="center" bgcolor="ccffcc"
| March 3 || Cal State Fullerton || Disch–Falk Field • Austin, TX || W 8–3 || 11–3 || 
|- align="center" bgcolor="ccffcc"
| March 4 ||  || Disch–Falk Field • Austin, TX || W 8–4 || 12–3 || 
|- align="center" bgcolor="ccffcc"
| March 9 ||  || Disch–Falk Field • Austin, TX || W 26–6 || 13–3 || 
|- align="center" bgcolor="ccffcc"
| March 10 || Maine || Disch–Falk Field • Austin, TX || W 7–68 || 14–3 || 
|- align="center" bgcolor="ccffcc"
| March 10 || Maine || Disch–Falk Field • Austin, TX || W 6–1 || 15–3 || 
|- align="center" bgcolor="ccffcc"
| March 11 ||  || Disch–Falk Field • Austin, TX || W 14–1 || 16–3 || 
|- align="center" bgcolor="ccffcc"
| March 11 || Emporia State || Disch–Falk Field • Austin, TX || W 7–2 || 17–3 || 
|- align="center" bgcolor="ccffcc"
| March 12 || Emporia State || Disch–Falk Field • Austin, TX || W 11–6 || 18–3 || 
|- align="center" bgcolor="ccffcc"
| March 12 || Emporia State || Disch–Falk Field • Austin, TX || W 8–3 || 19–3 || 
|- align="center" bgcolor="ccffcc"
| March 13 || Arizona State || Disch–Falk Field • Austin, TX || W 6–5 || 20–3 || 
|- align="center" bgcolor="ccffcc"
| March 14 || Arizona State || Disch–Falk Field • Austin, TX || W 3–2 || 21–3 || 
|- align="center" bgcolor="ccffcc"
| March 15 ||  || Disch–Falk Field • Austin, TX || W 5–2 || 22–3 || 
|- align="center" bgcolor="ccffcc"
| March 15 || Dallas Baptist || Disch–Falk Field • Austin, TX || W 13–3 || 23–3 || 
|- align="center" bgcolor="ccffcc"
| March 16 || Dallas Baptist || Disch–Falk Field • Austin, TX || W 14–3 || 24–3 || 
|- align="center" bgcolor="ffbbb"
| March 16 || Dallas Baptist || Disch–Falk Field • Austin, TX || L 6–7 || 24–4 || 
|- align="center" bgcolor="ccffcc"
| March 17 ||  || Disch–Falk Field • Austin, TX || W 12–0 || 25–4 || 
|- align="center" bgcolor="ccffcc"
| March 17 || Texas Wesleyan || Disch–Falk Field • Austin, TX || W 13–3 || 26–4 || 
|- align="center" bgcolor="ccffcc"
| March 18 || Texas Wesleyan || Disch–Falk Field • Austin, TX || W 6–2 || 27–4 || 
|- align="center" bgcolor="ccffcc"
| March 18 || Texas Wesleyan || Disch–Falk Field • Austin, TX || W 10–8 || 28–4 || 
|- align="center" bgcolor="ccffcc"
| March 19 ||  || Disch–Falk Field • Austin, TX || W 12–6 || 29–4 || 
|- align="center" bgcolor="ccffcc"
| March 19 || Southwestern Oklahoma State || Disch–Falk Field • Austin, TX || W 12–5 || 30–4 || 
|- align="center" bgcolor="ccffcc"
| March 20 ||  || Disch–Falk Field • Austin, TX || W 11–4 || 31–4 || 
|- align="center" bgcolor="ccffcc"
| March 20 || Hardin–Simmons || Disch–Falk Field • Austin, TX || W 13–2 || 32–4 || 
|- align="center" bgcolor="ccffcc"
| March 24 || at  || Cougar Field • Houston, TX || W 4–3 || 33–4 || 1–0
|- align="center" bgcolor="ccffcc"
| March 24 || at Houston || Cougar Field • Houston, TX || W 19–0 || 34–4 || 2–0
|- align="center" bgcolor="ccffcc"
| March 25 || at Houston || Cougar Field • Houston, TX || W 12–10 || 35–4 || 3–0
|- align="center" bgcolor="ccffcc"
| March 30 ||  || Disch–Falk Field • Austin, TX || W 5–2 || 36–4 || 4–0
|- align="center" bgcolor="ccffcc"
| March 31 || Arkansas || Disch–Falk Field • Austin, TX || W 7–5 || 37–4 || 5–0
|- align="center" bgcolor="ffbbb"
| March 31 || Arkansas || Disch–Falk Field • Austin, TX || L 4–13 || 37–5 || 5–1
|-

|- align="center" bgcolor="ffbbb"
| April 2 ||  || Disch–Falk Field • Austin, TX || L 2–3 || 37–6 || 
|- align="center" bgcolor="ffbbb"
| April 2 || Lubbock Christian || Disch–Falk Field • Austin, TX || L 1–6 || 37–7 || 
|- align="center" bgcolor="ffbbb"
| April 3 || Lubbock Christian || Disch–Falk Field • Austin, TX || L 1–3 || 37–8 || 
|- align="center" bgcolor="ccffcc"
| April 3 || Lubbock Christian || Disch–Falk Field • Austin, TX || W 5–4 || 38–8 || 
|- align="center" bgcolor="ccffcc"
| April 6 || at  || TCU Diamond • Fort Worth, TX || W 12–1 || 39–8 || 6–1
|- align="center" bgcolor="ffbbb"
| April 7 || at TCU || TCU Diamond • Fort Worth, TX || L 6–710 || 39–9 || 6–2
|- align="center" bgcolor="ccffcc"
| April 8 || at TCU || TCU Diamond • Fort Worth, TX || W 16–8 || 40–9 || 7–2
|- align="center" bgcolor="ccffcc"
| April 13 ||  || Disch–Falk Field • Austin, TX || W 11–1 || 41–9 || 8–2
|- align="center" bgcolor="ccffcc"
| April 14 || Baylor || Disch–Falk Field • Austin, TX || W 7–2 || 42–9 || 9–2
|- align="center" bgcolor="ccffcc"
| April 14 || Baylor || Disch–Falk Field • Austin, TX || W 5–0 || 43–9 || 10–2
|- align="center" bgcolor="ffbbb"
| April 20 || at  || Cameron Field • Houston, TX || L 2–313 || 43–10 || 10–3
|- align="center" bgcolor="ccffcc"
| April 21 || at Rice || Cameron Field • Houston, TX || W 3–2 || 44–10 || 11–3
|- align="center" bgcolor="ccffcc"
| April 21 || at Rice || Cameron Field • Houston, TX || W 10–4 || 45–10 || 12–3
|- align="center" bgcolor="ccffcc"
| April 24 ||  || Disch–Falk Field • Austin, TX || W 5–2 || 46–10 || 
|- align="center" bgcolor="ccffcc"
| April 24 || Southwestern || Disch–Falk Field • Austin, TX || W 9–1 || 47–10 || 
|- align="center" bgcolor="ccffcc"
| April 28 || at  || Tech Diamond • Lubbock, TX || W 7–3 || 48–10 || 13–3
|- align="center" bgcolor="ccffcc"
| April 28 || at Texas Tech || Tech Diamond • Lubbock, TX || W 8–2 || 49–10 || 14–3
|- align="center" bgcolor="ffbbb"
| April 30 || at Texas Tech || Tech Diamond • Lubbock, TX || L 5–8 || 49–11 || 14–4
|-

|- align="center" bgcolor="ccffcc"
| May 4 ||  || Disch–Falk Field • Austin, TX || W 12–6 || 50–11 || 15–4
|- align="center" bgcolor="ffbbb"
| May 5 || Texas A&M || Disch–Falk Field • Austin, TX || L 7–10 || 50–12 || 15–5
|- align="center" bgcolor="ccffcc"
| May 5 || Texas A&M || Disch–Falk Field • Austin, TX || W 13–6 || 51–12 || 16–5
|-

|-
! style="background:#BF5700;color:white;"| Post-Season
|-

|- align="center" bgcolor="ccffcc"
| May 11 ||  || Disch–Falk Field • Austin, TX || W 8–1 || 52–12 || 1–0
|- align="center" bgcolor="ccffcc"
| May 12 ||  || Disch–Falk Field • Austin, TX || W 15–4 || 53–12 || 2–0
|- align="center" bgcolor="ccffcc"
| May 13 || Texas A&M || Disch–Falk Field • Austin, TX || W 9–5 || 54–12 || 3–0
|-

|- align="center" bgcolor="ccffcc"
| May 25 ||  || Disch–Falk Field • Austin, TX || W 6–0 || 55–12 || 1–0
|- align="center" bgcolor="ccffcc"
| May 25 ||  || Disch–Falk Field • Austin, TX || W 12–3 || 56–12 || 2–0
|- align="center" bgcolor="ccffcc"
| May 27 || Lamar || Disch–Falk Field • Austin, TX || W 6–5 || 57–12 || 3–0
|-

|- align="center" bgcolor="ccffcc"
| June 1 ||  || Johnny Rosenblatt Stadium • Omaha, NE || W 6–3 || 58–12 || 1–0
|- align="center" bgcolor="ccffcc"
| June 4 || Cal State Fullerton || Johnny Rosenblatt Stadium • Omaha, NE || W 6–4 || 59–12 || 2–0
|- align="center" bgcolor="ccffcc"
| June 7 || Arizona State || Johnny Rosenblatt Stadium • Omaha, NE || W 8–4 || 60–12 || 3–0
|- align="center" bgcolor="ffbbb"
| June 8 || Oklahoma State || Johnny Rosenblatt Stadium • Omaha, NE || L 13–18 || 60–13 || 3–1
|- align="center" bgcolor="ffbbb"
| June 10 || Cal State Fullerton || Johnny Rosenblatt Stadium • Omaha, NE || L 1–3 || 60–14 || 3–2
|-

References

Texas Longhorns baseball seasons
Texas Longhorns
College World Series seasons
Southwest Conference Baseball Tournament champion seasons
Texas Longhorns baseball
Southwest Conference baseball champion seasons